Loíza is a town and municipality on the northeastern coast of Puerto Rico, north of Canóvanas; east of Carolina, Puerto Rico; and west of Río Grande, Puerto Rico. Loíza is spread over five barrios and Loíza Pueblo (the downtown area and the administrative center of the city). It is part of the San Juan-Caguas-Guaynabo Metropolitan Statistical Area. It is renowned for its rich Afro-Puerto Rican culture and heritage.

History
Some say its name comes from a female cacique, named Loaíza or Yuíza, who governed the region formerly called Jaymanío, on the shores of the Río Grande de Loíza. It is said that this cacique might have married a mulatto conquistador called Pedro Mejías, but there is no evidence of this. Other sources point to a Spanish landlord named Iñigo López de Cervantes y Loayza, who owned a lot of the territory, and was renowned among governors and colonists of the time.

In 1692, Loíza was officially declared an urban area due to its population (100 houses and 1,146 residents), but it was in 1719 that the Spanish government declared it as an official town. It was founded by Gaspar de Arredondo.

Puerto Rico was ceded by Spain in the aftermath of the Spanish–American War under the terms of the Treaty of Paris of 1898 and became a territory of the United States. In 1899, the United States Department of War conducted a census of Puerto Rico finding that the population of Loíza was 12,522.

In the 1970s, an Aero Virgin Islands DC-3 plane crashed in a Loíza beach, with no fatalities.

On September 20, 2017 Hurricane Maria struck Puerto Rico.  In Loíza, 598 residences lost their roof and 298 homes were a total loss. Loíza suffered a catastrophic hit from Hurricane Maria like the rest of Puerto Rico. In 2018, it was featured in an episode of Bar Rescue called Operation: Puerto Rico where bar consultant Jon Taffer visited Loíza to rescue an area bar and turned it into a community rescue, repairing a local community center, playground, baseball field and basketball court as well as the bar.

Gallery

Geography
Loíza belongs to the geographical region called the Coastal Plains of the North. Its terrain is uniformly plain, since it doesn't exceed 100 meters above water level.

Barrios

Like all municipalities of Puerto Rico, Loíza is divided into barrios.

Canóvanas
Loíza barrio-pueblo
Medianía Alta 
Medianía Baja
Torrecilla Alta
Torrecilla Baja

Sectors

Barrios (which are like minor civil divisions) in turn are further subdivided into smaller local populated place areas/units called sectores (sectors in English). The types of sectores may vary, from normally sector to urbanización to reparto to barriada to residencial, among others.

Special Communities

 (Special Communities of Puerto Rico) are marginalized communities whose citizens are experiencing a certain amount of social exclusion. A map shows these communities occur in nearly every municipality of the commonwealth. Of the 742 places that were on the list in 2014, the following barrios, communities, sectors, or neighborhoods were in Loíza: La 23 in Honduras barrio, Sector Pompeya (Los Pizarros) in Honduras barrio, Sector Villa del Carmen in Honduras barrio, Calle Melilla, Colobó, El Ceiba, El Jobo, Miñi Miñi Piñones, Pueblo del Niño, Tocones, Villa Cañona 1, Villa Cañona 2, Villa Colobó, Villa Kennedy, Villa Santos, and Zapatería Pizarro.

In late May 2020, the mayor of Loíza announced that millions of dollars received from FEMA (Federal Emergency Management Agency) had been earmarked for 10 construction projects in Loíza. Of the ten, the largest project is for scheduled improvements to the Miñi Miñi Sector of Medianía Baja barrio.

Demographics

The population of the municipality was 23,693 at the 2020 census. Consisting of 8,508 households, and 6,140 families residing in the municipality. The population density was 1,673.4 inhabitants per square mile (646.1/km2). There were 8,508 housing units at an average density of 562 per square mile (217/km2). There were 8,508 households, out of which 45.8% had children under the age of 18 living with them, 49.1% were married couples living together, 29.7% had a female householder with no husband present, and 16.3% were non-families. 14.9% of all households were made up of individuals, and 5.3% had someone living alone who was 65 years of age or older. The average household size was 3.39 and the average family size was 3.77. In the town the population was spread out, with 39.3% under the age of 19, 7.8% from 20 to 24, 27.4% from 25 to 44, 17.3% from 45 to 64, and 8.2% who were 65 years of age or older. The median age was 27 years. The median income for a household in the town was $8,962, and the median income for a family was $9,911. Males had a median income of $14,076 versus $12,903 for females. The per capita income for the town was $4,707. 67% of the population and 64.7% of families were below the poverty line. Out of the total population, 62.3% of those under the age of 18 and 59.5% of those 65 and older were living below the poverty line. The municipality has the highest concentration of Afro-Puerto Ricans on the island. About 4,256 residents speak English as a native language (Census 2000).

Tourism

Landmarks and places of interest 
There are 19 beaches in Loíza.

Some other attractions of Loíza include:
Aviones Beach
Ayala Family Artesan Centre
Julia de Burgos Walk
María de la Cruz Cavern
Piñones Lagoon
San Patricio Parish
Vacía Talega Beach
 (Samuel Lind Art Studio)

Culture
 
One of Loíza's barrios, Loíza aldea, is famous across Puerto Rico because it has been a talent pool for dancers and artisans. Formerly a center for black Puerto Rican music, it is said to be the traditional birthplace of the musical form known as plena along with Ponce.

Each year there is a celebration in Loíza where people parade around wearing Máscaras de Vejigante, a type of mask made from coconuts and painted in multiple colors.

Loíza is known as "La Capital de la Tradición" (Capital of Traditions) for its bomba music, traditional Taíno and African dishes, folk art, and distinct culture.

Festivals and events
Loíza celebrates its patron saint festival in March. The  is a religious and cultural celebration that generally features parades, games, artisans, amusement rides, regional food, and live entertainment.

Other festivals and events celebrated in Loíza include:
Mayombe Carnival – February
Festival of Saint James the Apostle – July

Economy

Agriculture
Coconuts, fruits, sugar canes, and apples.

Industry
Fishing

Government

Like all municipalities in Puerto Rico, Loíza is administered by a mayor. The current mayor is Julia María Nazario Fuentes, who was elected at the 2016 Puerto Rican general elections.

The city belongs to the Puerto Rico Senatorial district VIII, which is represented by two Senators. In 2016, Nayda Venegas Brown and Eric Correa Rivera were elected as District Senators.

Symbols
The  has an official flag and coat of arms.

Flag
Green and gold and red with three undulating stripes - The silhouette of a bell tower in the upper  left hand  corner (Canton) of the first stripe represents religious tradition and also serves as a symbol of the Church of San Patricio as an historical monument.

Coat of arms
The mounted figure of Saint James the Apostle, dominant in the shield, proclaims the devotion to the saint that the Loiceños profess, manifested in a special way during the celebration of traditional festivities every July 25. The flames are emblem of the Holy Spirit, bearer of the seven gifts, a title of the old church of Loíza. The undulating stripe represents the Grande de Loíza River, notable in geography, history and literature of Puerto Rico. The crown symbolizes the famous Taína Chief Yuisa, who lived in Loíza territory where she died. The shamrocks represent Saint Patrick of Ireland and patron of the population.

Education

Like all other municipalities, education in Loíza is administered by the Department of Education of Puerto Rico. Loíza has several elementary schools, but only two junior high and two high schools.

Transportation
Service to Loiza is available from San Juan by AMA route D45. This route provides service to Piñones and Isla Verde and connects to the Tren Urbano at Sagrado Corazon station.

There is no public transportation connecting Loiza to the eastern cities of PR, and there are few if any hotels and guest houses in Loiza itself, but there are resorts in Rio Grande.

There are 5 bridges in Loíza.

Gallery

See also

List of Puerto Ricans
History of Puerto Rico
Did you know-Puerto Rico?

References

External links
 News out of Loíza on Presencia PR
 Loíza and its barrios, United States Census Bureau
 Historic Places in Puerto Rico and the Virgin Islands, a National Park Service Discover Our Shared Heritage Travel Itinerary
 Puerto Rico Government Directory - Loíza

 
Municipalities of Puerto Rico
Afro–Puerto Rican
Populated places established in 1719
Populated coastal places in Puerto Rico
1719 establishments in the Spanish Empire